Mhlambanyatsi is a town in western Eswatini. It is located 18 kilometres southwest of the capital, Mbabane.

References
Fitzpatrick, M., Blond, B., Pitcher, G., Richmond, S., and Warren, M. (2004)  South Africa, Lesotho and Swaziland. Footscray, VIC: Lonely Planet.

Populated places in Manzini Region